Youngblood Hawke is an American novel by Herman Wouk. It may also refer to:

 Youngblood Hawke (film), based on the novel
 Youngblood Hawke (band), an American indie pop band
 Youngblood Hawke, their 2012 self-titled EP